Swindle is a 2002 crime thriller film written and directed by K.C. Bascombe and starring Tom Sizemore, Sherilyn Fenn and Dave Foley.

Plot
Four thieves attempt to make the richest score in history.

Cast
Tom Sizemore as Seth George
Sherilyn Fenn as Sophie Zenn
Dave Foley as Michael Barnes
Conrad Pla as Cisco
Katie Griffin as Judy

See also
Girls with guns

External links

2002 films
American thriller films
2002 crime thriller films
2002 independent films
Girls with guns films
2000s American films